Natalie Grant has released ten studio albums, one live album, one compilation album and twenty-eight singles since the beginning of her career in 1999.

Studio albums

Compilations
2008: Natalie Grant Collector's Edition (Curb Records)

Singles

As lead artist

As featured artist

Collaborations and guest appearances

Notes

References

Discographies of American artists
Christian music discographies